Ampang is a common place name in Malaysia and may refer to:

 Jalan Ampang, a major street in Kuala Lumpur
 Ampang, Selangor, a city within Selangor, formed from a portion of the former Ampang District
 Ampang, Kuala Lumpur, the eastern portion of the former Ampang district
 Ampang District, a former district
 Ampang Subdistrict (mukim), a subdistrict of Hulu Langat district of Selangor
 Ampang (federal constituency), represented in the Dewan Rakyat
 Ampang Jaya (federal constituency), formerly represented in the Dewan Rakyat (1986–2004)
 Ampang (state constituency), formerly represented in the Selangor State Legislative Assembly (1959–86; 1995–2004)

See also 
 Ampang Park, a shopping center